Copargo  is a town, arrondissement, and commune in the Donga Department of western Benin. The commune covers an area of 876 square kilometres and as of 2013 had a population of 70,938 people.

References

Arrondissements of Benin
Communes of Benin
Populated places in Benin